Daher, or DAHER, is a French industrial conglomerate.

Daher may also refer to:

Places
 Daher, Egypt, or alternatively El Zaher, a district in Cairo, Egypt
 Daher (Kuwait), a district in Al Ahmadi Governorate, Kuwait
 Hospital Daher, a hospital in Brasília, Brazil
 Mazraat el Daher, a village located on Mount Lebanon, Lebanon

People
 Anita Daher, Canadian writer of juvenile and teen books
Eduard Daher, current Melkite Greek Catholic Archbishop of the Melkite Greek Catholic Archeparchy of Tripoli.
 Ignatius Michael IV Daher (1761–1816), Patriarch of the Syriac Catholic Church from 1801 to 1810
 José Zalaquett Daher (born 1942), Chilean lawyer, and human rights activist during the General Augusto Pinochet regime
 Kassem Daher, Lebanese-Canadian accused of membership in a number of Islamic militant groups
 Michel Daher, Lebanese entrepreneur and politician. Member of Lebanese Parliament. Founder of Daher Foods
 Nínawa Daher (1979–2011), Argentine lawyer and journalist of Lebanese descent
 Pierre Daher, Hungarian physician and politician of Lebanese descent, member of the Hungarian National Assembly
 Pierre El Daher, Lebanese businessman, who has been the chairman and CEO of the Lebanese Broadcasting Corporation
 Ray Daher, Lebanese rugby league player
 Salam Daher, Lebanese civil defense worker who became the focus of controversy in the aftermath of the Israeli airstrike on Qana
 Thaísa Daher de Menezes, Brazilian two-time Olympic gold volleyball player
 Dhaher al-Omar, Arab-Bedouin ruler and founder of modern Haifa

See also
SOCATA, also known as DAHER-SOCATA, formerly EADS Socata, producer of general aviation aircraft